Ugāle parish is an administrative unit of the Ventspils Municipality, Latvia.The parish has a population of 2476 (as of 1/07/2010) and covers an area of 292.239 km2.

Villages Ugāle parish 
 Ciesengure
 Cirkale
 Māteri
 Modes
 Rāpati
 Sirgumi
 Ugāle
 Ugāles dzirnavas

Parishes of Latvia
Ventspils Municipality